Kar Kondeh and Kar Kandeh may refer to:
 Kar Kondeh, Golestan
 Kar Kandeh, Mazandaran